Shane Richardson Reeves is a United States Army brigadier general serving as the 15th Dean of the United States Military Academy.

Military career
Reeves graduated from the West Point in 1996 with a Bachelor of Science degree and was commissioned as an armor officer. Upon graduation he served for four years at the Fort Irwin National Training Center in various positions. He subsequently became a part of the Judge Advocate General's Corps after graduating from law school at William & Mary in 2003. Later, Reeves served in numerous legal positions with the 1st Infantry Division, 1st Armored Division, The Judge Advocate General's Legal Center and School, and Joint Special Operations Command. He also completed a Master of Laws degree in military justice at The Judge Advocate General's Legal Center and School in 2008.

Career at West Point
Since 2011, Reeves taught in United States Military Academy’s Law Department. Where in 2015 he became deputy department head, and later department head in 2020. In this capacity Reeves also a founded and was the inaugural and director of the Lieber Institute for Law and Land Warfare. On May 28, 2021, Reeves succeeded Cindy Jebb as the Dean.

Personal life
Reeves is married and has three children. He is admitted to practice law before the Virginia State Bar, the United States Court of Appeals for the Armed Forces, and the United States Supreme Court.

Citations

Year of birth missing (living people)
Living people
United States Military Academy alumni
William & Mary Law School alumni
The Judge Advocate General's Legal Center and School alumni
United States Military Academy faculty
United States Army generals